The Punjabis in British Columbia: Location, Labour, First Nations, and Multiculturalism is a 2012 book by Kamala Elizabeth Nayar, published by the McGill-Queen’s University Press (MQUP). The book discusses Punjabi immigrants to northern British Columbia in the period after World War II, and several chapters have a focus on the Punjabis of Skeena Country. The book has information on the female Punjabi experience. The book also discusses anti-Punjabi sentiments found in the First Nations peoples of British Columbia.

Anne Murphy of the University of British Columbia (UBC) wrote that the book has "substantive" criticisms of the uses and extent of Canada's multiculturalism policies.

Reception

Michaela Pontellini of the Vancouver Weekly wrote that "I truly enjoyed this book" and that due to the large amount of detail inside, "I would not recommend it to anyone looking for some light reading."

See also
 Indo-Canadians in British Columbia
 The Sikh Diaspora in Vancouver

References
 Murphy, Anne (University of British Columbia). "The Punjabis in British Columbia: Location, Labour, First Nations, and Multiculturalism" (book review). BC Studies, Summer, 2014, Issue 182, p.240-242.

Notes

Further reading
Taylor, Christopher. "Moving beyond Multiculturalism: A Blueprint for Cultural Synergy" (Archive) (book review). H-Canada, H-Net Reviews. December, 2013
 

2012 non-fiction books
History books about British Columbia
Asian-Canadian culture in British Columbia
Indo-Canadian culture
Punjabi diaspora
Books about immigration in Canada
Immigration to British Columbia
Asian immigration to Canada